Rheinlandhalle, is an arena in Krefeld, Germany.  It is primarily used for ice hockey, and was home to the Krefeld Pinguine of the Deutsche Eishockey Liga until the König Palast opened in 2004.  It opened in 1955 and holds 6,714 spectators.

References

Indoor arenas in Germany
Indoor ice hockey venues in Germany
Buildings and structures in Krefeld
Sport in Krefeld
Sports venues in North Rhine-Westphalia